Arthur John "Syd" Slater QPM (16 December 1914 – 8 March 1994) was an Australian rules footballer who played with Essendon and North Melbourne in the Victorian Football League (VFL).

Slater came to the VFL from Gisborne, in the Riddell District Football League. He started as a forward and kicked four goals on his Essendon debut in the opening round of the 1935 season, against Melbourne at the Melbourne Cricket Ground. The feat was overshadowed by teammate Ted Freyer who kicked 12 goals, a then club record. Despite the promising start up forward, Slater spent most of his time at Essendon in defence and as a follower. He won the best and fairest award for the Essendon seconds in 1938. From 1940 to 1945, Slater played for North Melbourne, then in 1946 crossed to Brunswick in the Victorian Football Association.

Outside of football, Slater worked for Victoria Police, rising to the rank of Superintendent. He was awarded the Queen's Police Medal in 1970.

References

1914 births
Australian rules footballers from Victoria (Australia)
Essendon Football Club players
North Melbourne Football Club players
Brunswick Football Club players
Gisborne Football Club players
Australian police officers
Australian recipients of the Queen's Police Medal
1994 deaths